Brenda, Lady Maddox  ( Murphy; February 24, 1932 – June 16, 2019) was an American writer and biographer, who spent most of her adult life living and working in the UK, from 1959 until her death. She is best known for her biographies, including on Nora Barnacle, the wife of James Joyce, and for her semi-autobiographical book, The Half-Parent: Living with Other People's Children.

Education and early life
Born Brenda Murphy in Bridgewater, Massachusetts in 1932, she graduated from Harvard University (class of 1953) with a degree in English literature. She also studied at the London School of Economics.

Career
She was a book reviewer for The Observer, The Times, New Statesman, The New York Times, and The Washington Post, and regularly contributed to BBC Radio 4 as a critic and commentator. Her biographies of Elizabeth Taylor, D.H. Lawrence, Nora Joyce, W. B. Yeats and Rosalind Franklin have been widely acclaimed. She received the Los Angeles Times Biography Award, the Silver PEN Award, the French Prix du Meilleur Livre Etranger, and the Whitbread Biography Prize.

Maddox lived in London and spent time at her cottage near Brecon, Wales where she and her husband, Sir John Maddox (d. 2009), were actively involved within the local community. She was vice-president of the Hay-on-Wye Festival of Literature, a member of the Editorial Board of British Journalism Review, and a past chairman of the Broadcasting Press Guild. Maddox had two children and two stepchildren.

Her best-known biography, that of James Joyce's wife Nora Barnacle, was made into a 2000 movie, Nora, starring Susan Lynch in the title role and Ewan McGregor as Joyce.  

Her biography of the scientist James Watson was published in 2016.

Awards and honours
Maddox was elected a Fellow of the Royal Society of Literature (FRSL) in 1999. She won the Suffrage Science award in 2011.

Bibliography
Beyond Babel: New Directions in Communications
The Half-Parent: Living with Other People's Children
Who's Afraid of Elizabeth Taylor? A Myth of Our Time
Nora: A Biography of Nora Joyce
D.H. Lawrence: The Story of a Marriage, UK edition The Married Man: A Life of D. H. Lawrence, London: Sinclair-Stevenson, 1994.
Yeats's Ghosts: The Secret Life of W.B. Yeats
Rosalind Franklin: The Dark Lady of DNA
"Mother of DNA"
"The woman who cracked the BBC's glass ceiling"
Maggie: The First Lady
"The whole world in his hand" The Times, May 27, 2006.
George Eliot: Novelist, Lover, Wife
Reading the Rocks: How Victorian Geologists Discovered the Secret of Life
Freud's Wizard: The Enigma of Ernest Jones

Personal life
Brenda met John Maddox, then a science correspondent for The Guardian, while visiting Europe in 1958. They  married in 1960, and settled in London, where she raised two stepchildren and had three more children of her own. She died on June 16, 2019, aged 87.

References

1932 births
2019 deaths
American biographers
American emigrants to England
American science writers
British journalists
Fellows of the Royal Society of Literature
Harvard University alumni
People from Bridgewater, Massachusetts
Wives of knights